Poul David Reichhardt (2 February 1913 – 31 October 1985) was a Danish actor, well known for his roles in Danish 1940s/1950s comedies. Later on, he also played more serious and varied roles; he has also starred in Huset på Christianshavn, Matador and as various minor characters in the Olsen-banden films.

For almost thirty years Reichhardt was a leading Danish heroic charmer in movies and partly also on stage. His acting debut was in 1931 as an extra in the play Styrmand Karlsens flammer in Nørrebros Theater. Already during the 1930s he won himself a name, this was cemented during World War II and from 1945 he stood as the movie hero par excellence: the plain, regular, quick-witted, sometimes hot-tempered, but often humorous man playing in melodramas and comedies. His versatile talent of acting and singing created him a widespread area as an artist.

Poul Reichhardt got a special popularity during his performing in the so-called Morten Korch movies in the 1950s based upon novels written by a just as popular Danish regionalist light literate – here he normally played the honest young farmer fighting for his happiness and for his love. Often criticised for playing in low quality products he always did his best even in poor roles and his temporary overplay and loudness was compensated by his engagement and self-irony. Perhaps his best movie roles were as a resistance man (De røde Enge - "The Red Meadows", 1945), and as the soldier in Soldaten og Jenny, ("The Soldier and Jenny", 1947. His ability as a singer even made him opera roles (Papageno in The Magic Flute) and though normally considered a typical "man of the people" he also mastered the role as a man of the world.

Besides his many popular roles Reichhardt also, mostly on stage, emerged into a respected character actor (Biff and later Willy Loman in Death of a Salesman, Archie in Osborne's The Entertainer, several Shakespeare roles). He also dubbed the animated films Fantasia and The Sword in the Stone when they were released in Danish. Not leaving the heroic line until relatively late he won a new popularity in elder roles also on TV. Perhaps his most popular one was as the blustering and intolerant but yet sympathetic furniture remover Olsen in the series Huset på Christianshavn ("The House on Christianshavn"). In the fall of 1981, he suffered a cerebral hemorrhage, which left him partially paralyzed. For the last four years of his life, the popular actor was dependent on a wheelchair, and Poul Reichhardt died at the age of 72 on October 31, 1985.

Reichhardt is the father of actor Peter Reichhardt.

Selected filmography

External links 
 
 Profile from Den Store Danske 
 Profile from the Danish Film Database 
 Original cinema trailers with Poul Reichhardt

1913 births
1985 deaths
Danish male actors
Danish male film actors
Best Actor Bodil Award winners
People from Egedal Municipality
20th-century Danish male actors